Andriy Hloba (born 24 January 1999) is a professional Ukrainian football midfielder who plays for FC Kremin Kremenchuk.

Career
Hloba is a product of the different youth sportive school systems from Kirovohrad Oblast.

After spent career in the teams of amateur or lower level, in July 2018 he signed a deal with the Premier League club FC Oleksandriya and made his debut in the Ukrainian Premier League on 24 October 2020, playing as the second half-time substituted player in an away losing match against FC Dynamo Kyiv.

References

External links 
Statistics at UAF website (Ukr)

1999 births
Living people
Ukrainian footballers
FC Inhulets-2 Petrove players
FC Inhulets-3 Petrove players
FC Oleksandriya players
FC Sumy players
FC Kremin Kremenchuk players
Ukrainian Premier League players
Ukrainian Second League players
Association football midfielders